125P/Spacewatch, is a periodic Jupiter-family comet. It was discovered on September 8, 1991, by Tom Gehrels using the 0.91 m Spacewatch telescope at the Kitt Peak National Observatory. It has a diameter of 1.6 km.

References

External links 
125P/Spacewatch @ Minor Planet Center.

Periodic comets
0125

Comets in 2013
Comets in 2018
19910908